(ANPI; National Association of Italian Partisans) is an association founded by partisans and participants of the Italian Resistance against the Italian fascist regime and the subsequent Nazi occupation during World War II. ANPI was founded in Rome in 1944, as the war continued in northern Italy. It was constituted as a charitable foundation on 5 April 1945. It persists due to the activity of its anti-fascist members.

History
The National Association of Italian Partisans was created by volunteers who took part in the war in the central regions of the Italian peninsula.

After the fall of the Italian Social Republic, the ANPI spread over the country as far as the southern tip of Italy. Most of the partisans who fought came from the center-north of Italy, but there were also members from Yugoslavia, Greece and France.

But after the first national congress, which took place in Rome in 1947, problems arose due to different visions of internal and foreign politics within the group.

The intense discussions eventually led to the following partisan groups leaving the association:
 in 1948, independent and Catholic groups created the FIVL (Italian Federazion Freedom’s volunteers,)
 in 1949, the groups related to Giustizia e Libertà created the FIAP (Italian Federation of the Partisan Associations,).

List of ANPI National Congresses

 Rome, 6–9 December 1947
 Venice, 19–21 March 1949
 Rome, 27–29 June 1952
 Milan, 6–8 April 1956
 Turin, 19–21 June 1959
 Rome, 14–16 February 1964
 Bologna, 18–21 March 1971
 Florence, 4–7 November 1976
 Genoa, 26–29 March 1981
 Milan, 10–13 December 1986
 Bologna, 2–5 June 1991
 Naples, 28–30 June 1996
 Abano Terme (PD), 29–31 March 2001
 Chianciano Terme (SI), 24–26 February 2006
 Turin, 24–27 March 2011
 Rimini, 12–15 May 2016
 Riccione, 24–27 March 2022

Objectives
ANPI’s objectives are the maintenance of the historical role of the partisan war by means of research and the collection of personal stories. Its goals are a continued defense against historical revisionism and the ideal and ethical support of the high values of freedom and democracy expressed in the 1948 constitution, in which the ideals of the Italian resistance were collected.

Members

Unlike other veterans' associations, veterans can become ANPI members if they belong to one of the categories listed in Article 23 of its regulations. These include partisans, patriots, soldiers who fought against German soldiers after the Armistice between Italy and Allied armed forces, prisoners or deportees—during the civil war—for political activities or racial discrimination, imprisoned military persons who did not support the Italian Social Republic, and also all citizens who, without any distinction of age, declare themselves as antifascists, in accordance to ANPI regulations. 
With the introduction of a new regulation, approved during the 14th congress, in 2006, ANPI allowed a generational change in the direction of members of the association. In 2010 its membership count was about 110,000 affiliated members.

In addition to the 10% of members categorized as "historic partisans", 10% of the organization consists of young people between 18 and 30 years of age, and the majority of members (60–65%) are between 35 and 65 years old.

In the three years between 2006 and 2009, membership increased from 83,000 to 110,000, with a great number of young antifascists elected to high-ranking positions at the local and national level.

In June 2010, Dacia Maraini and Concita De Gregorio created a membership enrollment campaign that recruited many artists and intellectuals as testimonials. Among them were Marco Bellocchio, Andrea Camilleri, Massimo Carlotto, Liliana Cavani, Roberto Citran, Cristina e Francesca Comencini, Vincenzo Consolo, Simone Cristicchi, Serena Dandini, Emma Dante, Sabrina Ferilli, Dario Fo, Matteo Garrone, Fabrizio Gifuni, Giorgia, Irene Grandi, Ugo Gregoretti, Monica Guerritore, Margherita Hack, Fiorella Mannoia, Simona Marchini, Neri Marcorè, Mario Monicelli, Giuliano Montaldo, Claudia Mori, Moni Ovadia, Marco Paolini, Michele Placido, Gigi Proietti, Franca Rame, Lidia Ravera, Toni Servillo, Paolo Sorrentino, Sergio Staino, Roberta Torre, Nadia Urbinati, Vauro, and Gustavo Zagrebelsky.

Structure

The association is currently structured with local groups, district groups, council groups, and provincial and regional committees. The association's headquarters are at Via degli Scipioni 271, Rome.

Arrigo Boldrini was the ANPI president from the first congress (1947) until 2006. Until June 2009 Tino Casali was the honorary president, Raimondo Ricci was the national president and Armando Cossutta was the vice-president.

In April 2011 the national committee of the ANPI elected new leadership. Carlo Smuraglia, partisan fighter, lawyer, senator, and labor-rights professor was elected to be the new national president. The following vice-presidents were also elected: Armando Cossutta, Luciano Guerzoni, Giovanna Stanka Hrovatin, Lino "William" Michelini, Carla Nespolo, Marisa Ombra, Alessandro Pollio Salimbeni, and Massimo Rendina. National secretaries include: Carlo Smuraglia (Presidente), Luciano Guerzoni, Marisa Ferro, Marisa Ombra, Carla Argenton, Andrea Liparoto, and Paolo Papotti.

In May 2016 the national committee confirmed the presidency of Carlo Smuraglia, electing Luciano Guerzoni, Carla Nespolo, Marisa Ombra, Alessandro Pollio Salimbeni as vice-presidents.

In 2017, following an announcement by Smuraglia, Carla Nespolo was elected to the office of national president, the first woman to be elected to the position and also the first president not to have participated in the original partisan struggle in WWII. Smuraglia was conferred the title president emeritus.

National Presidents of the A.N.P.I.
 Arrigo Boldrini (9 December 1947 – 5 February 2006)
 Agostino "Tino" Casali (5 February 2006 – 17 June 2009)
 Raimondo Ricci  (17 June 2009 – 16 April 2011)
 Carlo Smuraglia (16 April 2011 – 3 November 2017)
 Carla Federica Nespolo (3 November 2017 –  4 October 2020)
 Gianfranco Pagliarulo (since 30 October 2020)

Patria Indipendente
ANPI publishes a magazine called Patria Indipendente (Independent Nation). Since 2015 it is only published digitally.
The magazine focuses on historical-political issues, noting events related to the Italian resistance and promoting the respect of Constitutional themes.

ANPI national festival
Since 2008, every two years ANPI organizes its national festival. During the event, meetings, debates, and musical concerts that focus on antifascism, peace, and democracy are organized.

Editions

See also
 Armistice between Italy and Allied armed forces
 Francesco Fausto Nitti, former ANPI official
 International Brigades

References

External links
 ANPI – Associazione Nazionale Partigiani d'Italia – ANPI official website
 ANPI Rome, historical archive

Modern history of Italy
World War II resistance movements
Italian resistance movement
Italian veterans' organisations
Organizations established in 1945
Anti-fascist organisations in Italy
1945 establishments in Italy